Thomas Derksen (born 26 October 1988), known as "Afu" Thomas, is a German internet celebrity active in China.

Biography 
Afu was born as Thomas Derksen, on 26 October 1988, into a Aussiedler family in Gummersbach, Germany, which later moved to Marienheide where Afu was raised. He is the youngest of six children of Maria, a chef, and Peter Derksen, an engineer, preceded by three brothers and two sisters. He is of Volga German descent, his ancestors emigrated to Russia with Catherine the Great. His family returned to Germany from the Soviet Union in 1987, and Afu is the only child of his parents who was born in Germany.

As a student at Engelbert-von-Berg-Gymnasium Wipperfürth, he took Chinese for two years there and did a student exchange trip to China in 2007, his first time in the country. After briefly working in banking at  he studied at Ruhr University Bochum, taking courses about business and Chinese. From 2013 to 2014, he attended Fudan University, and has lived in Shanghai since 2016. He is fluent in Mandarin and has been learning the Shanghainese dialect.

His videos depict his experiences in Shanghai. His wife and two employees help Derksen manage his social media profile, including Bilibili, Tencent QQ, and Sina Weibo. He has expressed an interest in the Chinese e-commerce model, writing a letter in 2017 to German Chancellor Angela Merkel on how Germany could follow China in its cashless payment system. In June 2019, he was reported to have 15 million fans in the country.

In February 2020, he uploaded a video interview with German virologist  who was in China at the time to assist with the COVID-19 situation; the video garnered more than 3.2 million views on Bilibili. He later followed with a video (where he spoke English instead of Chinese or German) titled "Fight the Virus not China".

Books 
 Und täglich grüßt der Tigervater: Als deutscher Schwiegersohn in China, 2018, ISBN 978-3-641-23907-7
 Kartoffelbrei mit Stäbchen: drei Chinesen, fünf Länder, sieben Tage – mit meiner chinesischen Familie auf Hochzeitsreise in Europa, 2021, ISBN 978-3-453-60573-2

See also
 Lee and Oli Barrett - British social media figures in China
 Dashan - Canadian television personality in China
 Raz Gal-Or - Israeli social media figure in China
 David Gulasi - Australian internet celebrity active in China
 Amy Lyons - Australian internet celebrity active in China
 Winston Sterzel - South African social media figure in China
 China–Germany relations

References

Further reading
  - Video

External links
 
 Review: Book presentation with Afu Thomas - German Centre for Industry and Trade Shanghai, BayernLB Group

Living people
1988 births
Social media influencers
German expatriates in China
German Internet celebrities
People of Volga German descent
People from Gummersbach
Ruhr University Bochum alumni
Fudan University alumni